Venera Rashitovna Absalyamova (born ) is a Russian female  track cyclist. She competed at the 2011 and 2012 UCI Track Cycling World Championships.

References

External links
 Profile at cyclingarchives.com

1986 births
Living people
Russian track cyclists
Russian female cyclists
Place of birth missing (living people)